Brickellia conduplicata, the southwestern brickellbush, is a species of flowering plant in the family Asteraceae. It is native to northeastern Mexico in the states of Tamaulipas and San Luis Potosí.

References

External links
Photo of herbarium specimen at Missouri Botanical Garden, collected in San Luis Potosí, syntype of Brickellia conduplicata

conduplicata
Flora of Northeastern Mexico
Plants described in 1907